El Cacao may refer to:
El Cacao, Los Santos
El Cacao, Panamá Oeste
El Cacao, Veraguas, Panama